Ferenc Čaba (born 11 February 1954) is a Yugoslav wrestler. He competed in the men's Greco-Roman 68 kg at the 1980 Summer Olympics.

References

External links
 

1954 births
Living people
Yugoslav male sport wrestlers
Olympic wrestlers of Yugoslavia
Wrestlers at the 1980 Summer Olympics
Place of birth missing (living people)
People from Kanjiža